Aybars is a Turkish forename meaning either “gray/yellow leopard” or “leopard of the moon” related to Turkic mythology. The stem of the name comes from "ay" ('moon' in Turkic) and "bars" ('leopard' in Turkic). However, according to Pritsak and Nishanyan, the first word is "oy" rather than "ay", which means 'gray' or 'yellow' or 'brown', hence the meaning of the name is 'yellow/gray/brown leopard', referencing to lion.

Given name
 Aybars Garhan, Turkish footballer

Surname
 Ateşan Aybars, Turkish economist and TV celebrity
 Feridun Aybars, Turkish former swimmer

References

Turkish masculine given names